Georges Spénale (29 November 1913 – 20 August 1983) was a French writer, poet and politician. He was the president of the European Parliament from 1975 to 1977.

1913 births
1983 deaths
Presidents of the European Parliament
Politicians of the French Fifth Republic
MEPs for France 1958–1979
Senators of Tarn (department)